Batey Anita Airport is located in Consuelo, Dominican Republic. It is another airport next to a Batey that used to serve as cargo airport for the products of the Batey.

See also 
Consuelo Airport

References

External links 
 
 Consuelo Batey Anita airport at OurAirports

Airports in the Dominican Republic
Buildings and structures in San Pedro de Macorís Province